Densified coal is the product of the Coldry Process coal upgrading technology that removes moisture from low-rank coals such as sub-bituminous and lignite/brown coal. The densification process raises the calorific value of low-rank coal to equal or exceed that of many export-grade black coals. Densified coal resulting from the Coldry Process is regarded as a black coal equivalent or replacement for black coal.

The Coldry Process is a patented coal upgrading technology being developed in Victoria, Australia by Environmental Clean Technologies Limited based on 'brown coal densification'. It has been developed specifically to improve low-rank brown coal (lignite) and some forms of sub-bituminous coal by removing the majority of the naturally occurring moisture content; harden and densify the coal; raise the calorific value of the coal; and transform the coal into a stable (lower spontaneous combustion risk), exportable black coal equivalent product for use by black coal fired power generators to produce electricity or as a feedstock for downstream processes such as coal-to-gas, oil and other high value chemicals.

Overview 
The Coldry Process evolved from theoretical and test work in the Department of Organic Chemistry, University of Melbourne, Victoria, in collaboration with CRA Advanced Technical Development, Melbourne in 1989. This work was based on earlier theoretical work around Densified coal undertaken by the Department of Organic Chemistry, University of Melbourne in 1980-81.
The possibility of creating densified coal was identified following observations made at the Maddingley Mine near Bacchus Marsh, Victoria. The mine operator observed that hardened bitumen-like road surfaces formed naturally soon after rain events when trucks had churned up brown coal fines with moisture when they entered and left the mine. In the days that followed a rain event the road surfaces at the mine would harden like tarmac and no longer absorb water. Dr Johns and colleagues identified that a process of low-mechanical shear had occurred where brown coal mixed with a small amount of moisture and subject to low-level mechanical shear had substantially destroyed the coal porous structure and triggered a mild natural exothermic reaction process within the coal leading to the mobilisation and subsequent evaporation of its moisture content. The low mechanical shear process fundamentally alters coal physical porous structure and to varying degrees the micro chemical bonds within the coal, reducing moisture content to between 10 and 14 per cent; boosting calorific value over 5200 kcal/kg; and creating a new ‘densified coal’ product that is hydrophobic, no longer prone to spontaneous combustion, readily transportable and from a commercial and environmental point of view, a black coal equivalent.

Principle
Essentially, brown coal is sheared and attritioned reducing the mean particle size and releasing water naturally held in the porous coal microstructure forming a plastic mass. This dispersal of surface and physically trapped moisture lends itself to evaporative removal at or near ambient temperatures. Shearing also opens fresh coal surfaces exposing reactive molecular species, which participate in new bond-forming reactions and liberate some chemically trapped moisture. As the pellets densify, the newly formed structure shrinks, resulting in a significantly more compact microstructure compared to the original coal. This new structure significantly reduces the propensity to self-heat to that of a typical bituminous coal. When applied to lignite and some sub-bituminous coals, the Coldry process produces a feedstock in the form of densified pellets that significantly reduce CO2 emissions compared to its original brown coal state, when combusted to generate electricity. A key feature of the technology is its use of low-grade 'waste heat' from a co-located power station to provide the evaporative drying energy. Typically, power stations shed that energy via cooling towers, drawing significant water from local river systems. The Coldry plant is designed to act as a heat sink for the power station, offsetting or replacing water taken from the environment for cooling. 
The temperature range for drying is between 35°C and 45°C. This forms the basis for the synergy with existing mine-mouth power stations and avoids the need to incur increased operational expense by generating high-grade process heat, or by calling on high-grade heat from other processes, that may have higher value in other applications.

Process Overview

The adjacent image illustrates the schematic layout of an integrated Coldry fired power station.

1. Raw Coal Feed
Raw coal is screened to remove oversize and contaminants, and sized to ensure a uniform feed into the next process step.

2. Attritioning & Extruding
A small amount of water is added to the mill attritioner, where the coal is sheared to form a coal paste. This intensive mixing initiates a natural chemical reaction within the coal which ejects both chemically trapped water, as well as physically absorbed water within the coal pore structure. The coal paste is then further masticated, finally being extruded into pellets.

3. Conditioning
The coal paste pellets are surface dried on the Conditioning belt to provide sufficient green strength to withstand the transition to the next step, the Packed Bed Dryer.

4. Heat Exchange
Waste heat form the co-located power station is recovered using heat exchange. This low grade energy stream is used to provide the warm air streams required to evaporate surface water from the coal pellets.

5. Packed Bed Dryer
Incoming moist coal pellets from the Conditioning belt are further dried to their ultimate moisture level within the packed bed dryer. Warm air from the heat exchangers removes the moisture rejected from within the coal pellets. The cross-linking reactions come to completion within the dryer, increasing the coal pellets' strength to levels sufficient to withstand bulk transport.

6. Coldry Pellets
The incoming brown coal has now been converted into a Black Coal Equivalent (BCE) through the permanent elimination of structural and physical trapped water. These high energy pellets are available for thermal applications, as well as other uses.

7. Pulveriser
The pulveriser reduces the pellets into finely ground coal dust, suitable for injection into a Pulverised Coal Combustion boiler.

8. Boiler
The coal is burned in excess air, producing a high temperature gas stream. This high temperature heats the water in the boiler, generating the steam needed for power generation.

9. Turbine
High temperature, high pressure stream is injected into the steam turbine, which is connected to the generator. High voltage electricity is the finished product from this operation.

10. Condenser
Steam exhausted from the turbine is passed into the condenser, where it is cooled to again form liquid water. This liquid water is pumped back into the boiler to start the steam cycle once again. The cooling water from the condenser is now at elevated temperatures, and needs to be cooled. It is pumped to the Coldry plant for heat exchange (step 4).

11. Cooling Tower
Return water from the Coldry heat exchange is now at a lower temperature, but still requires further cooling. This water is now pumped into the cooling tower, where a portion evaporates, cooling the remainder down to suitable temperatures for the condenser operation. Make up water is added to replace that which was lost to evaporation.

Characteristics of densified coal 
The chemical and calorific values of densified coal derived from typical Victorian brown coal with a natural average moisture content of 60 per cent by weight compares well with typical high grade black coal exported from Tarong Queensland, and Newcastle New South Wales Australia.

Chemical composition

Comparison of calorific values 

adb = as dry basis. ar = as received. db = dry basis. wb = wet basis.

History 
For some years the Maddingley Mine provided brown coal to an adjacent fibreboard manufacturing plant located on the outskirts of Bacchus Marsh. The plant and the mine were decommissioned in the late 1980s. In 1990 the Calleja Group transport company acquired the mine and the industrial site and became aware of the concept of densified coal. The company acquired Intellectual Property rights for the densified coal process around 1994. Under the leadership of David Calleja and David Wilson the company invested in the development of a densified coal methodology and succeeded with bench tests by 1997. At this time the technology process became known as the Coldry Process. For some time the company sought without success to include the Coldry Process as a technology worthy of review, investment and development by the government funded Cooperative Research Centre (CRC) for Lignite program. Subsequently the Calleja Group invested in the establishment in February 2004 of a pilot plant to further develop the process. By April 2004 the Coldry plant rapidly established itself as a potential commercial method to dewater brown coal without producing hazardous byproducts. The operation of the pilot plant was assigned to Asia Pacific Coal & Steel Pty Ltd (APCS) in June 2004 when APCS was licensed to commercialise the technology. In March 2006 APCS was acquired by ASX listed company Environmental Clean Technologies Limited (ASX:ESI), which took responsibility for commercialising the Coldry Process. The pilot plant has been incrementally developed at the Bacchus Marsh site and testing of coal types from around the world has helped characterise and validate coal suitability for use in the process.

Timeline
 The Coldry pilot plant, located in Bacchus Marsh, Victoria, Australia has been the centre for research and development of the process. 
 The pilot plant, originally commissioned as a basic batch process in 2004 to prove the process at its next logical scale, was further upgraded in 2007, with the support of the Victorian Governments Department of Sustainability. The upgrade to a continuous process, which also included the addition of water recovery technology, was successful and led to the engagement of engineering firm Arup in 2008 to further drive the commercialisation of the process, through pre-feasibility studies.
 At the beginning of 2011, ECT commenced critical equipment trials and detailed data gathering activities to inform the design for a commercial scale plant. 
 During October 2011, ECT commissioned engineering firm Arup to commence the detailed design for tender (DFT) for the next logical scale up; 20 tonne per hour demonstration plant. The commercial demonstration plant (CDP) is targeted to complete construction during 2014, subject to financing and government planning approvals.
2018: commercial plant using densified coal to be developed in India.

See also

 Bituminous coal
 Bergius process
 Coal assay
 Energy value of coal
 Orders of magnitude (specific energy density)
 Karrick process
 Leonardite
 Maddingley Mine
 List of CO2 emitted per million Joule of energy from various fuels

References

External links 
Environmental Clean Technologies website
 Coldry:Lignite Dewatering Process

Coal